Bluffwoods State Forest is state forest and conservation area in the Buchanan County of the south-western part of Missouri, USA. It is currently elevated 318 metres (1043 feet) above sea level and is mostly forested, with scattered grasslands dotted around the landscape. It has also been classified as an Important Bird Area, because of the sheer abundance of types of birds that mostly populate the forest. It is partially wheelchair accessible, with free admission. Pets are also allowed, as long as either they are a service animal, or they are on a leash.

References 

Missouri state forests
Geography of Buchanan County, Missouri
Important Bird Areas of Missouri